The Brahmin and the Mongoose (or The Brahmin's Wife and the Mongoose) is a folktale from India, and "one of the world's most travelled tales". It describes the rash killing of a loyal animal, and thus warns against hasty action. The story underlies certain legends in the West, such as that of Llywelyn and his dog Gelert in Wales, or that of Saint Guinefort in France. It is classified as Aarne-Thompson type 178A.

The story

The original version from the Panchatantra in Sanskrit goes as follows (translation from ):

In Western variants of the story, other animals take the place of the mongoose, most often a dog. It is also found in other versions as a weasel, cat (in Persia), bear, or lion, and the snake is sometimes replaced with a wolf (in Wales). The essence of the story, however, remains the same. Similarly, variants of the story sometimes have the man, instead of his wife, killing the loyal animal.

The story is sometimes placed within a frame story, where a saviour stands mistakenly accused and narrates this story, thereby preventing his own death.

Origin and travel
The story was first studied in 1859 by Theodor Benfey, the pioneer of comparative literature, when he compared the versions in India, the Middle East and Europe. In 1884, W. A. Clouston showed how it had reached Wales.

 
Murray B. Emeneau considers the migration of this story, through its steps from India to Wales, as "one of the best authenticated cases of such diffusions of folk-tales".  It is classified as Aarne-Thompson type 178A.

The story occurs in all versions of the Panchatantra, as well as the later Sanskrit works Hitopadesha and the Kathasaritsagara. It also occurs in most of the languages of India (and South Asia) where it is extremely familiar. For instance, in the South Indian state of Karnataka, the story occurs as a proverb in inscriptions, as a sculpture in a temple, in narratives of travelling storytellers and singers, and in film. Similarly, the Tamil epic Silappatikaram recalls the story simply by its name.

Like the rest of the Panchatantra, in its westward migration it travelled from Sanskrit to Arabic (as Kalila wa Dimna), Persian, Hebrew, Greek, Latin, Old French, and eventually into all the major languages of Europe (as The Fables of Pilpay or Bidpai), ranging from Russian to Gaelic to English. In its eastward migration, it appears in Chinese (ten versions, including in a redaction of the Vinaya Pitaka), and over a wide region from Mongolia to Malaysia. It is also the only story found in all recensions of the Panchatantra, all versions of the "Book of Sindibad" (not Sindbad), and all versions of "The Seven Sages of Rome".

It is also found in Mexico and the United States. Blackburn observes that the fable is not a dead tradition and is still current, as a Belgian newspaper reported it as an anecdote about a man who left his son and dog in a shopping trolley in his car.

The motif also occurs, with a happy ending, in the Disney film Lady and the Tramp (1955).

Reception and influence
The story is often used in culture as an exemplum cautioning against hasty action. It also serves as shorthand for sin, regret and grief.

In Welsh it became the story of the nobleman Llywelyn who kills his loyal dog, Gelert. It was later interpreted as a legend about a true event, and small shrines to the dog exist in Wales (such as in the village of Beddgelert, "Gelert's grave"). In France a similar metamorphosis took larger proportions, and the story became the cult of Saint Guinefort (a dog), which was popular until the 1930s.

Blackburn points out that although in the many literary versions it is the man who kills the mongoose, in most oral versions (and the literary version quoted above), it is the woman who does so.

See also
Jock of the Bushveld

Footnotes

Notes

References

External links
 Tales of AT 178A type by Prof. D. L. Ashiman, with examples from other cultures
 The friendly mongoose summary by Studdy

Brahmins
Fables
Fictional mongooses
Folklore
Jataka tales
Oral tradition
Sanskrit texts
Indian folklore
Indian fairy tales
Indian literature
ATU 150-199